Jan van der Sluis (April 29, 1889, in Rotterdam – October 19, 1952, in Rotterdam) was a Dutch amateur football (soccer) player who competed in the 1912 Summer Olympics. He was part of the Dutch team, which won the bronze medal in the football tournament.

References

External links
 
 

1889 births
1952 deaths
Dutch footballers
Footballers at the 1912 Summer Olympics
Olympic footballers of the Netherlands
Olympic bronze medalists for the Netherlands
Footballers from Rotterdam
Olympic medalists in football
Medalists at the 1912 Summer Olympics
Association football forwards
Netherlands international footballers